The Politics of Dancing may refer to:

 The Politics of Dancing (Re-Flex album), 1983
 "The Politics of Dancing" (song), the title track from this album
 The Politics of Dancing (Paul van Dyk album), 2001 
 The Politics of Dancing 2, 2005